Ottogerd Ludwig Wilhelm Mühlmann (12 February 1908, in Schmargendorf – 26 May 1987, in Nuremberg) was a German academic, art historian, notable for his work in historical preservation.

Life

Selected works

Monographs 
Untersuchungen zum „Geschoßbuch“ der Stadt Jena vom Jahre 1406, Jena: Vopelius 1938 (Teildruck der Dissertation).
 Kirchspiel Frießnitz. Baugeschichte und Ausstattung seiner Kirchen, Weida: Aderholds Buchdruckerei 1939.
 Das Leben eines Biedermeiers. Carl Ludwig Wachler, Weida 1941.
 Über das Antlitz unserer Thüringer Ahnen. Die Schnitzfiguren des Reichenfelser Museums und ihre Bedeutung für die Gegenwart, Weida (Selbstverlag): Emil Wüst & Söhne (Druckerei) 1945.
 Festschrift zum 500-jährigen Altarjubiläum in Friesau, Lobenstein: Goehring 1947.
 Baudenkmäler aus Jenas Umgebung. Zeugen unserer Vergangenheit (= Veröffentlichung der Volkshochschule Jena-Stadt), Jena 1954.
 Jena als mittelalterliche Stadt (= Bilder zur Geschichte Jenas, Band 2), Jena 1956, 2. Aufl. Jena: Kessler 1959.
 Die Universitätsstadt Jena (= Bilder zur Geschichte Jenas, Band 3), Jena: Kessler 1956; 2. Aufl. 1959.
 Schöne Heimat um Jena. Täler und Höhen, Dörfer und Kirchen, Burgen und Ruinen, Erwandertes und Erforschtes in Jenas Umgebung, Teilband 1 (= Schriften des Stadtmuseums Jena, Band 6), Jena: Kessler 1967; Teilband 2 (= Schriften des Stadtmuseums Jena, Band 9), Jena: Keßler 1970.
 Die Steine reden. Kirchen der Superintendentur Jena in Wort und Bild, Evangelische Verlagsanstalt Berlin 1970.
 Seltene Funde und Forschungen eines Denkmalpflegers. Beiträge aus Jena sowie seiner näheren und weiteren Umgebung, Nürnberg 1977.

Papers 
 Florian Geyer, ein Vorkämpfer völkisch-sozialen Wesens. Vortrag, gehalten am 1. Februar 1943 in der Deutschen Gesellschaft zu Leipzig, in: Nationalsozialistische Monatshefte, Folge 155/156 (1943), Februar/März, S. 58–70/130–142.
 Dr. Heinrich Bergner. Pfarrer und Kunsthistoriker, in: Willy Quandt (Bearb.): Bedeutende Männer aus Thüringer Pfarrhäusern. Gabe der Thüringer Kirche an das Thüringer Volk, Evangelische Verlagsanstalt Berlin 1957, S. 112–120.
 Künderin Thüringer Volkstums: Marthe Renate Fischer. Zur Wiederkehr ihres Geburtstages am 17. August 1851, in: Rudolstädter Heimathefte, 7. Jg. (1961), Heft 8/9, S. 221–223.
 Die tausendjährige Tradition der Kirche in Lobeda bei Jena, in: Aus zwölf Jahrhunderten. Einundzwanzig Beiträge zur thüringischen Kirchengeschichte (= Thüringer kirchliche Studien, Band 2), Evangelische Verlagsanstalt Berlin 1971, S. 45–57.
 Die Wallfahrtskirche zu Ziegenhain bei Jena. Eine Dokumentation über das Bauwerk und seine Geschichte, in: Jahrbuch für die Geschichte Mittel- und Ostdeutschlands, Band 29 (1980), S. 96–112.
 Das spätgotische Altarwerk in Ammerbach bei Jena, in: Kultur und Geschichte Thüringens 4 (1983), S. 107–127.
 Burg Orlamünde an der Saale, in: Kultur und Geschichte 6 (1985), S. 101–112.
 [Von einem, der Jena liebte]: Abriß einer Geschichte der Denkmalschutzbewegung in Jena nach 1945, in: Kultur und Geschichte Thüringens 7 (1986/87), S. 121–143.

Sources
 Joachim Hendel: „Von einem, der Jena liebte“ – Ottogerd Mühlmann (1908-1987). Heimatforscher, Denkmalschützer, Rassewart, in: Gerbergasse 18, Ausgabe 71 (2014), Heft 2, S. 29–34. 

1908 births
1987 deaths
German art historians
Writers from Berlin
People from Charlottenburg-Wilmersdorf